The Church of St Peter is a Grade II* listed building in Yoxall, East Staffordshire, Staffordshire, England, built in the early 13th century.

References

Grade II* listed churches in Staffordshire
13th-century church buildings in England